The 2017 Liga 3 Lampung season is the third edition of Liga 3 Lampung is a qualifying round of the 2017 Liga 3. Persilat are the defending champions.

Teams
19 clubs from entire Lampung will be join this league.
 Group A :
Persilamtim, Putrad PB, Ababil United, Persilu, Lampung.
 Group B :
Infa 39 MM, Karya Wiyata, La Plata YONIF 143/TWEJ F.C., SS Lampung
 Group C : 
Mesuji, Serasi, PS Tanggamus, Spectra F.C., Persilat.
 Group D : 
PSBL, Bintang Utama Utara, Bandar Lampung, Kampus City, Projaya South Lampung.

Champions

References

Lampung
Liga 3 (Indonesia)
Liga 3 (Indonesia) seasons
2017 in Indonesian football leagues
2017 in Indonesian football
Sport in Lampung